Natak Company is a Pune-based theatre troupe. Its previous members include Nipun Dharmadhikari, Alok Rajwade,  Amey Wagh, Siddharth Menon, Abhay Mahajan and Parna Pethe. In 2018, the group celebrated its 10th anniversary by organising a theatre festival at Yashwantrao Chavan Natyagruha, Kothrud.

History 
The troupe formed in 2008 as a collaboration between the students of Brihan Maharashtra College of Commerce and Fergusson College. The founding members were Amey Wagh, Nipun Dharmadhikari, Siddharth Menon, Alok Rajwade, Parna Pethe, Abhay Mahajan, Gandhaar Sangoram, Dharmakirti Sumant, Soumitra Gapchup, Ravi Choudhary, Siddhesh Purkar and Sayali Pathak. It grew to around 150 members.

Since being staged in 2009, their play Dalan has received positive response. The troupe performed in Italy's Universo Teatro in 2010. In 2014, in the memory of Tanveer, Rupwedh Pratishthan awarded the group an amount of 1.3 lakhs. In 2016, they staged their play Sindhu, Sudhakar, Rum ani Itar at NCPA's Pratibimb Marathi Theatre Festival. They revived Satish Alekar's play Mahanirvan, which was performed at Vinod Doshi Memorial Fest and National School of Drama's Theatre Olympics in February 2018. In 2019, they started a year-long series of talks related to theatre, called Kaan Drushti. It was curated by Parna Pethe.

Plays
The troupe is known for its experimental works and revivals of Marathi classic plays, such as Mahanirvan. Other plays include Sutti Butti, Don Shoor, Patient, Binkamache Sanwad, Tem, Dalan, Sindhu Sudhakar Rum ani Itar, Aparadhi Sugandh, Natak Nako, Shivachritra ani ek, Chakra, Ek Divas Mathakade and Mi...Ghalib.

Recognition 
Cycle (Purushottam Karandak in 2005).
Dalan (Thespo in 2008)
Geli Ekvees Varsha (Thespo in 2009)
 Best Play for Don Shoor (Purushottam Karandak in 2009)
 Best Set and Best Actor for Don Shoor (Sawai Karandak in 2009)
 Best Play and Best Actor in Lead Role (13th Mahindra Excellence in Theatre Award in 2018)

References

External links 
 

Theatre companies in India
Organisations based in Maharashtra
Culture of Maharashtra
2008 establishments in Maharashtra
Arts organizations established in 2008